Killer Klowns from Outer Space is a 1988 American science fiction horror comedy film written, directed and produced by the Chiodo Brothers, and starring Grant Cramer, Suzanne Snyder, John Allen Nelson and John Vernon. It is the only movie written and directed by the Chiodo Brothers, who also created the practical effects and makeup. It concerns a clan of evil extraterrestrials who resemble clowns. They arrive on Earth and invade a small town in order to capture, kill and harvest the human inhabitants to use as sustenance.

Killer Klowns from Outer Space was filmed in Watsonville, California, and at the Santa Cruz Beach Boardwalk. The film utilizes practical effects, including rubber suits. The score was composed by John Massari. The movie received generally positive reviews and has been considered a cult classic.

Sequels have been in development hell since the original film's release. Stephen Chiodo stated in 2016 that he hopes to produce three additional movies, or possibly a television series. In 2018, NBCUniversal's Syfy announced that it was in talks to license the rights to make one or more sequels.

Plot
Just outside the town of Crescent Cove, Mike Tobacco and his friend Debbie Stone are parked with other couples at the local lovers' lane when they spot a strange glowing object falling to Earth. Nearby, farmer Gene Green, believing it to be Halley's Comet, ventures into the woods to find the impact site. He stumbles upon a large circus tent-like structure, and he and his dog are captured by mysterious clown-like aliens known as "Klowns". Mike and Debbie arrive to investigate for themselves. Entering the structure, they discover a complex interior with bizarre rooms and eventually realize it is the object and a spaceship. They find a gelatinized Green encased in a sticky cocoon and are spotted by a klown, who shoots popcorn at them from a bazooka-like weapon and then chases them aided by another one who uses a living balloon dog.

Narrowly escaping to the local police station, they report the incident to one of the officers and Debbie's ex-boyfriend, Dave Hanson, and his curmudgeonly partner, Curtis Mooney. Mike takes Dave to the site of the ship, only to find it has disappeared and left a large crater in its place. They travel to the lovers' lane, only to find all the cars abandoned and covered in the cocoon's substance. The klowns begin encasing townspeople in cocoons using toy-like rayguns. Several klowns perform pranks and mock circus acts which result in the deaths of several onlookers.

Mike and Dave witness a klown using shadow puppets to shrink a crowd of people, then dump them into a bag full of popcorn, which are revealed to be klowns in larval form. Back at the police station, another klown arrives and Mooney arrests it, believing it to be a teenage prankster. Dave returns to the station to find the place ransacked and the klown using a deceased Mooney as a ventriloquist's dummy. Dave shoots the alien in the nose, which causes it to spin wildly and explode.

Mike meets with his friends, Rich and Paul Terenzi, and using the loudspeaker on their ice cream truck, they drive around town attempting to warn people of the klowns. At Debbie's house, popcorn from her earlier encounter with the klowns evolves into juvenile klowns and attacks her. As she attempts to escape, she is intercepted by the klowns, who trap her in a giant balloon. Mike, Dave, and the Terenzis witness Debbie's capture and give chase, following the klowns to the local amusement park, where they have relocated their ship. Journeying through a funhouse, the Terenzi brothers become separated. After Dave and Mike witness a klown using a drinking straw to drink one of the gelatinized townspeople's blood, they rescue Debbie and flee into a maze full of traps.

The trio then finds themselves surrounded by a legion of klowns. The Terenzis arrive in their ice cream truck and use the PA to distract the aliens. A gargantuan klown puppet, Jojo the Klownzilla, appears and destroys the ice cream truck, seemingly killing the Terenzis; Dave creates a distraction and Mike and Debbie escape before the ship begins to take off. Dave uses his badge to pierce Jojo's nose, causing it to explode and destroy the ship. A clown car drops out of the sky and Dave emerges along with the Terenzi brothers, who miraculously survived by hiding in the ice cream truck's freezer moments before it was destroyed. 

As the group watches the fireworks created by the ship's destruction, pies fall from the sky and land on their faces.

Cast

Production

The film's original title was simply Killer Klowns, but the filmmakers added the words "from Outer Space" to prevent audiences from assuming the film was a slasher movie. Filming took place in the city of Watsonville and at the Santa Cruz Beach Boardwalk. The film was Christopher Titus' first role in a motion picture. The popcorn gun used by the clowns in the film, which included a compressor that would allow the weapon to actually propel popcorn, was the most expensive prop made for the production, costing $7,000 to create and taking six weeks to build. The legs of the clowns' balloon animal dog were coated in latex by the film's special effects department in order to keep the balloon from popping on the pine needles which covered the ground.

While the Chiodo Brothers were well-known as special effects artists, much of the special effects work was carried out by other artists, allowing the brothers to focus more on their production duties. However, the brothers did personally construct the miniature set for the "Klownzilla" sequence.

Most of the vehicles used in the film were rented and therefore were not allowed to be damaged. Two cars were accidentally damaged; one was driven off a bridge, although it was only intended to roll a short distance, and the Jeep filled with webbing needed $3,000 of repairs after solvent in the webbing damaged the interior.

The Chiodo Brothers wanted to cast comedian Soupy Sales as the security guard killed by the clowns' acidic pies, as he was known for receiving pies in the face on his children's television show Lunch with Soupy Sales. However, the executive producers did not want to allocate funds to pay for Sales' plane ticket to the production, as they felt that audiences would not know who Sales was.

Jojo the Klownzilla, the colossal klown who appears at the end of the film, was originally intended to be created using stop-motion animation, but was instead portrayed by Charles Chiodo in a rubber suit. In the film's original finale, Deputy Dave dies in the explosion of the clowns' ship, but this was changed after audiences in test screenings desired a more upbeat ending.

Four molds were made for the main clowns. One was peanut shaped, another was triangular, circular, and the final shape was an inverted triangle. From those four molds the effects artists produced two clown characters from each. Klownzilla had its own mask molded specifically for its appearance.

Two of the masks that were used to create the clowns in the film were re-purposed and used to portray trolls in the 1991 film Ernest Scared Stupid.

Soundtrack
The film's score was composed by John Massari. The title song "Killer Klowns" was written and performed by the American punk rock band the Dickies and was released on their album Killer Klowns from Outer Space in 1988. Frontman Leonard Phillips wrote the song without seeing the movie. A limited-edition complete soundtrack was released in 2006 through Percepto Records and features twenty-six tracks of the score, the title song "Killer Klowns", and four bonus tracks at a running time just over sixty-nine minutes.

Release
Killer Klowns from Outer Space was released in the United States on May 27, 1988. The film was released on VHS by Media Home Entertainment in 1989, and then by 20th Century Fox Home Entertainment on July 17, 2001, and on VHS and DVD as part of MGM Home Entertainment's "Midnite Movies" line of home media releases on August 28, 2001. MGM released the film on Blu-ray on September 11, 2012.

On May 25, 2013, the film received a 35 mm screening at the Alamo Drafthouse Cinema in Vintage Park in Houston, Texas, as well as a 35 mm screening at the Alamo Drafthouse Cinema in Yonkers, New York on June 20, 2014.

On April 9, 2018, Arrow Films released their special edition Blu-Ray of Killer Klowns From Outer Space. This release was newly restored, with interviews, documentary featurettes, Klown auditions, bloopers, deleted scenes, a double-sided poster that features the original theatrical poster, as well as art by Sara Deck, and more.

Critical reception
The film has been considered a cult classic. On the review aggregation website Rotten Tomatoes, the film has an average score of 76%, based on 25 critic reviews. The site's consensus reads: "Killer Klowns from Outer Spaces title promises darkly goofy fun – and more often than not, the movie delivers." Leonard Klady of The Los Angeles Times wrote that the film "demonstrates both above-average technical skill and large dollops of imagination". Film critic Leonard Maltin initially declared the film a BOMB ("Strictly tenth-rate."), but gave the movie a second look after a few years; this time, Maltin awarded the picture two-and-a-half out of a possible four stars. In his second review, Maltin wrote "Routinely plotted, but vividly designed, with cheeky humor ... plays its premise to the hilt, all 'circus' bases touched".

Charles Bramesco of The A.V. Club recommended the film, writing that "The film is patently absurd, but the filmmakers are fully committed to that absurdity. It's hard not to respect", and noted the film's "enduring appeal". Charles Webb of MTV.com called the performances "a little rough", and wrote "If Killer Klowns isn't especially scary, it's only kind of funny but still gets by on the execution of extremely inventive visuals based on the clown/circus motif". Dread Central gave the film three out of a possible five stars. JoBlo.com gave the film a rating of 8/10, stating that the film "is the king of '80s B-movies and it delivers the tacky goods by the truckloads". John Gugie of HorrorNews.net gave the film a score of 3/5, calling it "a hit or miss for horror and sci-fi fans".

Author Matthew Chojnacki recommended the film in his book Alternative Movie Posters: Film Art From the Underground. Jim Craddock, in his book VideoHound's Golden Movie Retriever, gave the film two-and-a-half out of four bones, calling the film a "Visually striking, campy but slick horror flick that'll make you think twice about your next visit to the big top". Director Brian Herzlinger considers Killer Klowns from Outer Space to be "his favorite cult film".

Planned sequels
The Chiodo brothers planned to release a "requel" (a portmanteau of remake and sequel), titled Return of the Killer Klowns from Outer Space in 3D, in 2012. Stephen Chiodo was to direct the movie, and his brother Charles would be a production designer. Grant Cramer, who starred in the original film as Mike Tobacco, stated that his character would return. According to Cramer, Tobacco now would be a town drunk, whose ramblings about the Klowns are dismissed. When the Klowns come back, Tobacco, who has been preparing for their return, teams up with two young street performers to fight them. Cramer also said that there might be multiple sequels, each centered around a character from the original movie.

It was reported later that the release date had been delayed, but, according to the Facebook page for the film, it was "officially in post-production." A page on a website for the original movie promised that the follow-up film (referred to as a sequel, rather than a "requel") would be released in 2013.

In 2016 interviews, Stephen Chiodo stated that efforts to make further Killer Klowns productions had shifted, from planning one or more theatrical releases, to focus on television. He explained the concept of "a trilogy in four parts, with the original film being the first," adding, "We've got it all written out." However, he also ambiguously referred to the same plans as "a long arch series for cable" and "a long-ranging series".

On October 22, 2018, it was announced that the Syfy channel was in talks to license the rights to make one or more sequels to Killer Klowns from Outer Space, as well as additional movies in the Critters franchise.

Legacy
In 2005, SOTA Toys announced they would produce Killer Klown figurines as part of their Now Playing film action figures line.  One figure was produced in 2006.  After SOTA stopped producing the toys, Amok Time took over until 2017, when the company announced that its license to produce Killer Klown figures had expired. Both Klown and Shorty figures have become high-end collectibles, and are much sought after by collectors.

John Massari, the composer of the synthesizer-filled score for the movie, rerecorded the music with a full orchestra at Warner Brothers Studios in 2016.

In 2018, Klowns, as well as the infamous ice cream truck from the film, were featured in a Killer Klowns from Outer Space-themed "scare zone" at Universal Orlando's 28th annual Halloween Horror Nights event. On July 25, 2019, it was announced that the Killer Klowns from Outer Space scare zone of the previous year would be expanded into a full-fledged haunted house attraction for the 2019 event at both the Orlando and Hollywood locations. Later in August, it was revealed that exclusive Killer Klowns from Outer Space merchandise would be sold during Halloween Horror Nights. The haunted house later returned for the 2022 edition of Halloween Horror Nights at Universal Studios Hollywood. 

In 2021, Spirit Halloween dedicated a section of its seasonal stores to merchandise tied to the movie. In addition to costumes, statues, props, doormats, signage, and life-sized animatronic characters were featured.

In August 2022, it was announced that an asymmetrical multiplayer game based on the film was being developed by Teravision Games and published by Good Shepherd Entertainment with a planned release in early 2023 for Microsoft Windows, PlayStation 4, PlayStation 5, Xbox One and Xbox Series X/S.

See also
 Evil clown
 List of films featuring extraterrestrials

References

External links

 Official Website of the Chiodo Bros.
 
 

1988 films
1988 horror films
1980s comedy horror films
1980s science fiction horror films
American black comedy films
American comedy horror films
American science fiction horror films
Circus films
1980s English-language films
Alien invasions in films
Fictional clowns
Puppet films
Films set on spacecraft
Horror films about clowns
Comedy films about clowns
Films about extraterrestrial life
Films set in the United States
Films shot in California
1988 comedy films
Films directed by Stephen Chiodo
American exploitation films
1980s American films